Sarah Van Patten (born 1984) is an American ballet dancer. She began an apprenticeship at the Royal Danish Ballet at age 15. In 2001, at age 17, she became the youngest ever dancer to receive a contract at the company. Later that year, she joined the San Francisco Ballet as a soloist, and was promoted to principal dancer in 2007. She is set to retire from performing in 2022.

Early life
Van Patten was born in Boston. She started with ballet, tap and jazz, and later focused on ballet. Van Patten trained at Boston Ballet and began performing at age 8 in their annual performance of The Nutcracker. She later switched to Ballet Workshop of New England and performed at Massachusetts Youth Ballet under Jacqueline Cronsberg. Van Patten also learned some of George Balanchine's works, such as Serenade and Apollo under the direction of Cronsberg's daughter, Sandra Jennings, who danced at the New York City Ballet.

Career
When Van Patten was 15, Jennings recommended her to audition for the Royal Danish Ballet in Copenhagen, which was co-directed by Jennings' former colleague, Colleen Neary. Van Patten was offered an apprenticeship and was one of the few foreign dancers in the company. Three months later, she was chosen by choreographer John Neumeier to dance the opening night cast in a revival of his Romeo and Juliet, with Mads Blangstrup, a principal, as her Romeo. She turned 16 shortly before she debuted the role. In 2001, at age 17, Van Patten became a member of the corps de ballet, thus became the youngest dancer to receive a contract in the company's history. Later that year, she joined the San Francisco Ballet as a soloist, after meeting Helgi Tomasson, the director of the company, when he was staging his version of The Sleeping Beauty in Copenhagen.

Van Patten became a principal dancer in 2007. Her repertoire include lead roles such as Odette/Odile in Swan Lake, the title role in Giselle, the title role in John Neumeier's The Little Mermaid and Tatiana in Onegin. She had also originated roles such as in Justin Peck's Hurry Up, We're Dreaming, Cathy Marston's Snowblind, Arthur Pita's Björk Ballet and Christopher Wheeldon's Within a Golden Hour, and danced the roles of Cinderella and of the Stepsister Edwina in the North American premiere of Wheeldon's Cinderella, which was a co-production with Dutch National Ballet. She performed at galas in Europe and Australia.

Van Patten is set to retire from performing in 2022.

Selected repertoire
Van Patten's repertoire with San Francisco Ballet and other companies includes:

Awards and honors
Awards and honors:
Chautauqua Festival Artistic Director's Award, 1997.
Denmark's New Talent Prize, 2001.
Nominated for an Isadora Duncan Dance Award for Individual Performance, 2009
Isadora Duncan Dance Award for Best Ensemble Performance, 2009
Isadora Duncan Dance Special Award for "Many Faces of Giselle", 2012

Personal life
Van Patten, who did not attend high school, took her GED exam after she returned to the United States and earned her Bachelor's Degree at St Mary's College.

Van Patten is married and has two sons.

References

External links
 Official website

American ballerinas
San Francisco Ballet principal dancers
Royal Danish Ballet dancers
1984 births
Living people
American expatriates in Denmark
Prima ballerinas
21st-century American ballet dancers
Schools of the Sacred Heart alumni
People from Boston
21st-century American women